Melissa Raju Thomas is an Indian actress, screenwriter and model. She made her feature film debut in Geetu Mohandas' bilingual film Moothon (2019).

Early life and education 

At 13 years old, Melissa was scouted by a talent hunt reality contest in Kerala. At the time, she was only in 8th standard and was cast as a VJ for various shows on the leading Malayalam TV channel, Asianet. She soon became a popular VJ of the Malayalam show, "Valkannadi". 
She eventually stop VJ-ing to focus on her studies.

Melissa ranked first in her school and state with a final percentage of 97.33% in the CBSE Class X Board Exams. She then secured the SIA Youth scholarship awarded by the Ministry of Education, Singapore to study towards her GCE A Levels at Meridian Junior College. Believing that it would be a good learning and growth experience for her, Melissa took up the opportunity and moved to Singapore at the age of 16.

In 2012, Melissa was crowned the winner of the Navy Queen 2012 beauty pageant. After winning the pageant, she went back to Singapore to complete her undergraduate studies at the National University of Singapore. An accomplished scholar, she was part of the Dean's Honour Roll in Academic Year 2011-12 as well as Academic Year 2012-13.

Career
From 2016 to 2018, Melissa starred in various print and television advertisements including Television Commercials for major brands like "Mercedes Benz", "Kalyan Jewellers" and "Malabar Gold and Diamonds".

In January 2019, Melissa wrote and starred in the well-received short film Faded.

In 2019, she made her feature film debut in Geetu Mohandas' bilingual film Moothon (2019), which premiered at the Toronto International Film Festival 2019 internationally and at the Mumbai Film Festival 2019 in India. She played the challenging role of the character Amina, a village girl from Lakshadweep who reaches Mumbai and undergoes transformation.

In 2020, she was cast for an interesting special appearance role in Bejoy Nambiar’s film Taish. She has also mentioned that she is currently writing and working on new scripts.

Filmography

Films

Web series

References

External links

Indian film actresses
Living people
Year of birth missing (living people)
Actresses in Malayalam cinema
Actresses in Hindi cinema